Martin Page (born 1 January 1800 at Cambridge; died 28 February 1874 at Cambridge) was an English professional cricketer who played first-class cricket from 1820 to 1834 for Cambridge Town Club, making 13 known appearances in first-class matches.

References

External links

Bibliography
 Arthur Haygarth, Scores & Biographies, Volumes 1–2 (1744–1840), Lillywhite, 1862

1800 births
1874 deaths
English cricketers
English cricketers of 1787 to 1825
English cricketers of 1826 to 1863
Cambridge Town Club cricketers